The women's foil was one of eight fencing events on the fencing at the 1972 Summer Olympics programme. It was the eleventh appearance of the event. The competition was held from 2 to 3 September 1972. 44 fencers from 20 nations competed.

Results

Round 1

Round 1 Pool A

Round 1 Pool B

Round 1 Pool C

Round 1 Pool D

Round 1 Pool E

Round 1 Pool F

Round 1 Pool G

Round 1 Pool H

Quarterfinals

Quarterfinal A

Quarterfinal B

Quarterfinal C

Quarterfinal D

Semifinals

Semifinal A

Semifinal B

Final 

Ragno-Lonzi again lost to Gorokhova, but this time that was her only loss; her 4–1 record in the final earned her gold. Farkasinszky-Bóbis, Gorokhova, and Depetris-Demaille tied at 3–2, with touch-quotient the tie-breaker: Farkasinszky-Bóbis took silver at 1.214, Gorokhova earned bronze at 1.143, and Deptris-Demaille finished fourth at 0.875.

References

Foil women
1972 in women's fencing
Fen